Kela (Ikela, Okela), or Lemba, and Yela are a Bantu language of the Democratic Republic of Congo spoken by several hundred thousand people in the Kasai-Oriental, where the spoken dialect is "Kela", and Équateur Province, where the spoken dialect is "Yela".

References

Bangi-Ntomba languages